"Ride Captain Ride" is a song recorded by the American rock band Blues Image. It was co-written by the band's singer-guitarist Mike Pinera and keyboardist Frank "Skip" Konte, and was included on the group's 1970 album, Open. Released as a slightly shortened single in the spring of 1970, it shot up the charts, eventually reaching No. 4 in the US and Canadian charts, making it Blues Image's only Top 40 chart hit.  It reached No. 23 in Australia.

The longer version repeats the chorus a couple of times, before the instrumental coda leads the song to its fade out.

The guitar fills and main solo were performed by Kent Henry. Pinera plays the guitar solo at the end of the song.

The song was inspired by the number of keys on Pinera's Rhodes piano. Pinera said, "Okay, I need a first word. And what came into my head was '73.' I liked the rhythm, and I went, '73 men sailed up, from the San Francisco Bay.'...The song sort of just wrote itself from there."

In the lyrics, the crew invite others to ride along with them to new land, where they will feel free. However, the local people are too preoccupied with life's troubles to hear or answer their call. When the crew set sail, they are never seen or heard from again. The Captain rides with his crew on a mystery ship, which disappears forever.

Chart history

Weekly charts

Year-end charts

Covers 
The song was covered by Blood, Sweat & Tears in the album New City from 1975.

The song has been performed live many times by Phish with Page McConnell on lead vocals, notably during the "Ian's Farm" show on May 28, 1989.

References

1970 singles
Atco Records singles
Songs written by Mike Pinera
Atlantic Records singles
American rock songs
Songs about San Francisco